Theodoxus altenai is a species of freshwater snail with a gill and an operculum, an aquatic gastropod mollusk in the family Neritidae, the nerites.

Distribution 
The distribution of this species includes Antalya Province in southern Turkey.

The type locality is a lake near Döşemealti in Antalya Province, Turkey.

Description
The shell is exceptionally thin, light horny yellowish, translucent and shiny. The Whorls are flat and very rapidly increasing, with a brown quadrangular color pattern. The operculum is reddish, without an apophysis.

The width of the shell is 9.0-10.0 mm. The height of the shell is 6.0 - 7.0 mm.

Ecology
This snail lives in lakes.

References
This article incorporates public domain text from the reference

Neritidae
Endemic fauna of Turkey
Gastropods described in 1965